Acidum, a Latin adjective meaning acid, may refer to:
 Acidum tannicum, the Latin name of the tannic acid
 Acidum aereum, the Latin name of the carbon dioxide
 Acidum Salis, the Latin name of the hydrochloric acid

See also 
 Acida (disambiguation)
 Acidus (disambiguation)